The Asia/Oceania Zone is one of the three zones of regional Davis Cup competition in 2013.

In the Asia/Oceania Zone there are four different groups in which teams compete against each other to advance to the next group.

Teams

The 2013 Davis Cup Asia/Oceania Zone Group IV consisted of the following teams:

Group A

Group B

Format
The ten teams are split into two pools of five, the top nation from each pool play against the runner-up from the other pool. The two winners will be promoted.

The tournament was played on the week commencing 9 September 2013 at Aviation Tennis Club, Dubai, United Arab Emirates and it was played on outdoor hard court.

Groups

Group A

Bangladesh v Turkmenistan

Singapore v Bahrain

Bangladesh v Iraq

Singapore v Turkmenistan

Bangladesh v Singapore

Iraq v Bahrain

Bangladesh v Bahrain

Turkmenistan v Iraq

Turkmenistan v Bahrain

Singapore v Iraq

Group B

Qatar v Saudi Arabia

Jordan v Myanmar

Qatar v Kyrgyzstan

Saudi Arabia v Jordan

Qatar v Jordan

Myanmar v Kyrgyzstan

Qatar v Myanmar

Saudi Arabia v Kyrgyzstan

Saudi Arabia v Myanmar

Jordan v Kyrgyzstan

Play-offs

1st to 4th play-off

Turkmenistan v Saudi Arabia

Qatar v Singapore

5th to 6th play-off

Bahrain v Jordan

7th to 8th play-off

Bangladesh v Myanmar

9th to 10th play-off

Iraq v Kyrgyzstan

References

External links

Asia Oceania Zone IV
Davis Cup Asia/Oceania Zone